Richard Rodriguez (born July 31, 1944) is an American writer who became famous as the author of Hunger of Memory: The Education of Richard Rodriguez (1982), a narrative about his intellectual development.

Early life 
He was born on July 31, 1944, into a Mexican immigrant family in San Francisco, California. Rodriguez spoke Spanish until he went to a Catholic school at 6. As a youth in Sacramento, California, he delivered newspapers and worked as a gardener. He graduated from Sacramento's Christian Brothers High School.

Career 
Rodriguez received a B.A. from Stanford University, an M.A. from Columbia University, was a Ph.D. candidate in English Renaissance literature at the University of California, Berkeley, and attended the Warburg Institute in London on a Fulbright fellowship.  A noted prose stylist, Rodriguez has worked as a teacher, international journalist, and educational consultant, and he has appeared regularly on the Public Broadcasting Service show, NewsHour. Rodriguez's visual essays, Richard Rodriguez Essays, on "The News Hour with Jim Lehrer" earned Rodriguez a Peabody Award in 1997. Rodriguez’s books include Hunger of Memory: The Education of Richard Rodriguez (1982), a collection of autobiographical essays; Mexico's Children (1990); Days of Obligation: An Argument With My Mexican Father (1992), which was nominated for the Pulitzer Prize; Brown: The Last Discovery of America (2002); and Darling: A Spiritual Autobiography (2013). Rodriguez's works have also been published in Harper's Magazine, Mother Jones, and Time.

Instead of pursuing a career in academia, Rodriguez suddenly decided to write freelance and take other temporary jobs. Rodriguez worked as a contributing editor to newspapers and magazines, including Harpers and the Los Angeles Times. His first book, Hunger of Memory: The Education of Richard Rodriguez, was published in 1982. It was an account of his journey from being a "socially disadvantaged child" to becoming a fully assimilated American, from the Spanish-speaking world of his family to the wider, presumably freer, public world of English. However, the journey was not without costs: his American identity was achieved only after a painful separation from his past, his family, and his culture. "Americans like to talk about the importance of family values," said Rodriguez. "But America isn't a country of family values; Mexico is a country of family values. This is a country of people who leave home."

While the book received widespread critical acclaim and won several literary awards, it also stirred resentment because of Rodriguez's strong stands against bilingual education and affirmative action. Some Mexican Americans called him pocho, Americanized Mexican, accusing him of betraying himself and his people. Others called him a "coconut," brown on the outside, but white on the inside. He calls himself "a comic victim of two cultures."

Rodriguez's most recent book, Darling: A Spiritual Autobiography (2013), explores the important symbolism of the desert in Judaism, Islam and Christianity. In an interview before the book came out, Rodriguez reported that he was "interested in the fact that three great monotheistic religions were experienced within this ecology." A sample of the project appeared in Harper's Magazine (January 2008). In this essay, "The God of the Desert: Jerusalem and the Ecology of Monotheism," Rodriguez portrays the desert as a paradoxical temple, its emptiness the requisite for God's elusive presence.

Personal life 
Rodriguez is gay.  He came out in his book of essays Days of Obligation.

Bibliography

 
 
"Late Victorians" 1990. Harpers Magazine, October 1990

References

Further reading

America, May 22, 1982, pp. 403–404; September 23, 1995, p. 8.
The Americas, fall-winter, 1988, pp. 75–90.
American Scholar, spring, 1983, pp. 278–285, winter, 1994, p. 145.
Booklist, March 1, 2002, Bill Ott, review of Brown: The Last Discovery of America, p. 1184.
Christian Science Monitor Monthly, March 12, 1982, pp. B1, B3.
Commentary, July 1982, pp. 82–84.
', fall, 1985, pp. 25–34.
Melus, spring, 1987, pp. 3–15.
The New York Times Book Review, November 22, 1992, p. 42; April 7, 2002, Anthony Walton, "Greater than All the Parts, " p. 7.
Reason, August–September 1994, p. 35.
Time, January 25, 1993, p. 70.
Tribune Books (Chicago, IL), December 13, 1992, p. 1.
The Washington Post Book World, November 15, 1992, p. 3.*
Pérez Firmat, Gustavo. Tongue Ties: Logo-Eroticism in Anglo-Hispanic Literature. Palgrave, 2003.

External links 

 Profile at Perspectives in American Literature
 Essays at NewsHour Online (PBS)

 
 Jo Scott-Coe (Winter 2008). American Paradoxes. Narrative Magazine
 

1944 births
Living people
Academics of the Warburg Institute
Alumni of the Warburg Institute
American memoirists
American writers of Mexican descent
Columbia University alumni
Emmy Award winners
American gay writers
Harper's Magazine people
Hispanic and Latino American journalists
LGBT Hispanic and Latino American people
American LGBT journalists
Gay memoirists
LGBT people from California
National Humanities Medal recipients
Peabody Award winners
Stanford University alumni
University of California, Berkeley alumni
Writers from Sacramento, California
Writers from San Francisco
Fulbright alumni